Duplex cockingi is a moth of the family Erebidae first described by Michael Fibiger in 2010. It is known from Australia in south-western Queensland and the northern part of New South Wales.

The wingspan is 11–12 mm. The forewing is long and broad. The subterminal area is grey. The crosslines are all present and black. The terminal line is marked by dense black interneural spots. The hindwing is light grey, without a discal spot and the underside of the forewing is blackish grey, while the underside of the hindwing is grey, with an indistinct discal spot.

References

Micronoctuini
Taxa named by Michael Fibiger
Moths described in 2010